"The Frog's Legacy" is the sixth Christmas special episode of the BBC sitcom, Only Fools and Horses. It was first broadcast on 25 December 1987. In the episode, the Trotters search for the hidden gold legacy of Freddie "The Frog" Robdal, an old friend of their mother's.

Synopsis
Del Boy, Rodney and Albert travel to Hampshire to attend the wedding of Trigger's niece, Lisa, who appeared in the episode "Tea for Three". Whilst there, Trigger's Aunt Reenie Turpin (Joan Sims) informs Del about a Peckham-based gentleman thief, Freddie "The Frog" Robdal, from the early 1960s.

It is revealed that Del and Rodney's mother met Robdal and "befriended" him (a euphemism for Del's mother having had a brief sexual affair with him, as was revealed she had done many times with a number of men throughout the series' development) before Rodney was born and while she and her husband Reg were in the midst of an argument. Reenie describes Robdal as a very strait-laced man, into French wine and paintings. In 1963, Robdal and his gang broke into a bank in London and stole £250,000 in gold bullion; the rest of the gang were apprehended by the Police, but Robdal fled with the gold and hid it. It is on this information that Del embarks on a mission to find the lost gold, having inherited it from his mother on her death, who in turn, had had it bequeathed to her by Robdal in his will.

Uncle Albert, who met Robdal during the war, finishes the tale later in the episode by stating that shortly after stealing the gold, and whilst still on the run from the police, Robdal and an explosives expert known as "Jelly" Kelly, robbed a post office. During the robbery, Robdal inadvertently sat on a detonator, killing them both. Del mentions that he was told that Robdal had an affair with a married woman who lived on the estate and wonders why he left everything to Del and Rodney's mother. He also mentions that Robdal allegedly had a child by that woman who would be approximately Rodney's age now. Rodney overhears this absent-minded comment and starts thinking about the possibility that he may very well be that child, though Albert dismisses it as a rumour.

During the course of the story, Del gets Rodney a new job, though he declines to mention that it is working for the local funeral director as a chief mourner, a fact that angers Rodney upon finding out. While threatening Del, he accidentally leads the hearse the wrong way down a one-way street. However, through his job at the undertakers, Rodney finds out that Robdal purchased an extra large coffin from them in 1963 for a friend named Alfred Broderick. Rodney quickly deduces that "Alfred Broderick" is an anagram of Frederick Robdal, implying that Broderick did not exist, and that Robdal had purchased the coffin to hide the gold in and had arranged a fake funeral for it to be buried. While attempting to sell a faulty computer to Reverend Sturrock, the priest who married Andy and Lisa, Del learns that Sturrock also buried "Mr. Broderick". He then finally discovers the gold's whereabouts.

Having failed to mention it earlier, Albert confirms that Robdal earned the nickname "The Frog" because he was a frogman in the Royal Navy. Consequently, he buried the gold at sea to hide it from the authorities and intended to recover it at a later date, but was killed before he could do so. While Del vows to find the gold, Rodney once again asks Albert about his resemblance to Robdal; Albert again dismisses it as rumours, but does acknowledge that he and Robdal do look similar. Rodney then quips, "Freddie the Frog. Killed himself by sitting on someone else's detonator. What a plonker."

Episode cast

Production 
Most of the outside filming took place in Ipswich on the junction of Rectory and Seymour roads near Stoke Bridge.

This Christmas special marked the end of an era for Only Fools and Horses, both in front of and behind the cameras. Ray Butt, who had been the show's producer since it started in 1981, decided to leave the BBC shortly after filming was complete. The day before he left, Butt told John Sullivan that he should seriously consider letting Only Fools and Horses end with this episode; Butt felt that the show had run its course, and pointed to the disastrous reception of the previous year's Christmas special, "A Royal Flush", as proof of his point. Sullivan gave thought to Butt's words, but after "The Frog's Legacy" received a much more positive reception than "A Royal Flush" had done, decided to continue the show. However, Sullivan shared Butt's concerns that the show's format was starting to become stale, and so starting with the next Christmas special, "Dates", Only Fools and Horses would maintain a balance between Del's get-rich-quick schemes and the personal lives of the Trotter Family.

Story arc 
 This was the second occasion in the show's history that the issue of whether Rodney and Del share the same father was raised. It had previously been brought up in "Thicker than Water" when their estranged father Reg claimed that Del was not his son, though this was later exposed as troublemaking on his part. Although Albert assures Rodney that the suggestion that he was fathered by Freddie Robdal was just a rumour, "Sleepless in Peckham" settled the issue that Freddie was indeed Rodney's father. This was reiterated in the 2010 prequel trilogy Rock & Chips, in which Freddie (played by Nicholas Lyndhurst) has an affair with Del's mother, who gives birth to Rodney as a result. Writer John Sullivan suggested in a BBC interview that Robdal was due to appear in the episode, which would have been the final episode of the show, but later decided against it and established Robdal was already dead. "Sleepless in Peckham" would also establish that Del, as a young man, only ever knew Robdal as "Uncle Fred", which explained why Del was unfamiliar with Robdal's real name until Uncle Albert drunkenly told him the truth about Robdal's past with the Trotters.

Music
 Rick Astley: "Never Gonna Give You Up"
 Mel and Kim: "FLM"
 George Michael: "Faith"
 Wham!: "Wake Me Up Before You Go-Go"
 Sinitta: "So Macho"
 Sinitta: "Toy Boy"
 Bryan Ferry: "Smoke Gets in Your Eyes"

References

External links

1987 British television episodes
British Christmas television episodes
Hampshire in fiction
Only Fools and Horses special episodes
Television episodes about weddings